The term  is derived from the verb  (to donate) and originally meant 'a donation'. Such donations usually comprised earning assets, originally landed estates with serfs defraying dues (originally often in kind) or with vassal tenants of noble rank providing military services and forwarding dues collected from serfs. In modern times the earning assets could also be financial assets donated to form a fund to maintain an endowment, especially a charitable foundation.

Endowment
 [plural ] (literally, the 'donation'), denotes in its original meaning the donated or else acquired fund of landed estates whose revenues are taken to maintain a college and the pertaining church (i.e. collegiate church) and its collegiate or capitular canons (Stiftsherr[en]) or canonesses. Many  as endowments have been secularised in Protestant countries in the course of the Reformation, or later in revolutionary France and the areas later annexed to or influenced by Napoleonic France.

Ecclesiastical endowment
Some  survived and form still the endowments of modern mostly Catholic monasteries, then often called " X", such as Stift Melk.  is often used – pars pro toto – as a synonym for an endowed monastery. If the  endowment belongs to a collegiate church it is sometimes called . 'cathedral donation [fund]').

Endowment for unmarried Protestant women
In some Lutheran states the endowments of women's monasteries were preserved, with the nunneries converted into secular convents in order to maintain unmarried or widowed noble women (the so-called conventuals), therefore called ladies' foundations or noble damsels' foundations. Many of these convents were dissolved in Communist countries after the Second World War, but, in Denmark and the former West Germany, many continue to exist, such as the Stift Fischbeck. In Lower Saxony the former endowments of many Lutheran women's convents are collectively administered by the Klosterkammer Hannover, a governmental department, while others maintain their endowments independently or their endowments are administered by a collective body consisting of the noble families of a former principality (e.g. Neuenwalde Convent or Preetz Priory). Some of these charitable institutions which previously accepted only female members of noble families now also accept residents from other social classes.

General charitable endowment
Cusanusstift, a hospital).

Educational endowment
Similar to the English development, where canon-law colleges with their endowments became sometimes the nuclei for secular educational colleges the former Augustinian collegiate endowment in Tübingen is maintained until today as the Tübinger Stift, a foundation of the Lutheran Evangelical State Church in Württemberg for the theological education. The Catholic church has similar institutions, such as the Wilhelmsstift, also in Tübingen.

Collegial body or building
 is also used – totum pro parte – as the expression for the collegial body of persons (originally canons or canonesses) who administered it and for the building (compound) they used to meet or live in. If the  served or serves to maintain the specific college of a cathedral (a so-called cathedral chapter) then the building can be also called .

Territorial entity

Territory of statehood
If a canon-law college or the chapter and/or the bishop of a cathedral managed not only to gain estates and their revenues as a  but also the feudal overlordship to them as a secular ruler with imperial recognition, then such ecclesiastical estates (temporalities) formed a territorial principality within the Holy Roman Empire with the rank of an imperial state. The secular territory comprising the donated landed estates was thus called  (analogously translated as prince-bishopric) as opposed to an area of episcopal spiritual jurisdiction, called diocese. The boundaries of secular prince-bishoprics did usually not correspond to that of the spiritual dioceses. Prince-bishoprics were always much smaller than the dioceses which included (parts of) neighbouring imperial states such as principalities of secular princes and Free Imperial Cities. Prince-bishoprics could also include areas belonging in ecclesiastical respect to other dioceses.

Similar developments as to statehood allowed a number of monasteries (the so-called imperial abbeys) or regular canon colleges (e.g. Berchtesgaden Provostry) with feudal overlordship to (part of) their estates to gain imperial recognition as a principality too.

Ecclesiastical diocese
In Danish, Norwegian and Swedish the term  was adopted as a loan word from German. In an ecclesiastical respect it simply denotes a diocese of a bishop.

Territorial subdivision
At times in Nordic countries, a  formed an administrative jurisdiction under a Stiftamtmand (Danish).

Toponym
 Electorate-Archbishopric of Cologne (Kurerzstift Köln):
Oberstift, southerly area west of the Rhine with Bonn and Brühl;
, a more northerly, separate area with Rheinberg
 Electorate-Archbishopric of Mainz (Kurerzstift Mainz):
, the easterly territorially separate Lower Franconian, Hessian and Thuringian part with Aschaffenburg and Erfurt
, the westerly Rhenish part with Mainz
 Prince-Bishopric of Münster (Hochstift Münster):
, the southerly Westphalian part with Münster in Westphalia
, the northerly part, in ecclesiastical respect part of the diocese of Osnabrück
Prince-Bishopric of Utrecht (Sticht Utrecht):
Oversticht, the northerly territorially separate part
Nedersticht, the southerly part with Utrecht

In compound nouns
As a component the term  today usually takes the copulative "s" when used as a preceding compound.

References

Prince-bishoprics of the Holy Roman Empire
Church organization
Monasteries
Donation